Sir George Douglas Robb  (1899–1974) was a New Zealand surgeon, medical reformer, writer, and university chancellor.

Career
He was born at Auckland on 29 April 1899 and educated at the Auckland Grammar School and at the University of Otago (MB ChB). Robb had a reputation as something of a maverick and a rebel against the conventional medical establishment, as is discussed in a chapter in Brian Easton's book The Nationbuilders.

Robb was influential in the formation of the Auckland Medical School as part of the University of Auckland. From 1961 to 1962, he held the year-long position of President of the British Medical Association.

A series of annual lectures at the University of Auckland has been named after Doug Robb.

In the 1956 New Year Honours, Robb was appointed a Companion of the Order of St Michael and St George. He was made a Knight Bachelor in the 1960 Queen's Birthday Honours.

Personal life

Robb was a close friend of the New Zealand poet and writer A. R. D. Fairburn, whose "To a Friend in the Wilderness" was dedicated to Robb. On 6 November 1935, Robb married Helen Seabrook of Auckland. His autobiography, Medical Odyssey was published in 1967 by Collins Bros. & Co. Ltd., Auckland. Appendix 1 (4 pp.) contains a bibliography of Robb's surgical and medical articles and other writings. W. B. Sutch wrote of Robb: "Robb, unhappy with the politicians, became a foremost thoracic surgeon, and a leader in medical education and research."--The Quest for Security in New Zealand, 1840–1966; Oxford, 1966; p. 248.

There is a bronze head (1956) and portrait (1961) of Sir Douglas Robb by John Francis Kavanagh in the University of Auckland Art Collection.

Douglas Robb died in his sleep on the morning of his 74th birthday. His widow, Lady Robb, died in the 1979 Mount Erebus disaster.

References

Further reading 
Obituary. Sir Douglas Robb. (1974) New Zealand Medical Journal. Vol. 80, no. 521: 128–132.

External links
Entry in the Dictionary of New Zealand Biography

Brian Easton, The Nationbuilders, chapter 6

1899 births
1974 deaths
People educated at Auckland Grammar School
Medical educators
New Zealand thoracic surgeons
Academic staff of the University of Auckland
University of Otago alumni
Presidents of the British Medical Association
New Zealand Companions of the Order of St Michael and St George
New Zealand Knights Bachelor
Chancellors of the University of Auckland